This is a list of notable IFK Göteborg footballers. Generally, this means players that have played more than 300 matches in total for the club, although some exceptional players who have played fewer matches are also included. For a list of all IFK Göteborg players with a Wikipedia article, see the IFK Göteborg players' category. Players are listed according to total number of games played. Substitute appearances included.

Key
 GK — Goalkeeper
 DF — Defender
 MF — Midfielder
 FW — Forward

References

Notes 

 
Goteborg, IFK
Association football player non-biographical articles